Alexandr Aleksandrovich Smyshlyaev (born 16 March 1987) is a Russian freestyle skier who specializes in the moguls discipline.

Career
Smyshlyaev competed at the 2006, 2010, 2014, and 2018 Winter Olympics. At the 2010 Olympics in Sochi, he won a bronze medal in the men's moguls event.

At the 2015 Freestyle World Ski Championships in Kreischberg, he won a bronze medal in the men's moguls event.

References

External links
 
 
 

1987 births
Living people
People from Lysva
Russian male freestyle skiers
Freestyle skiers at the 2006 Winter Olympics
Freestyle skiers at the 2010 Winter Olympics
Freestyle skiers at the 2014 Winter Olympics
Freestyle skiers at the 2018 Winter Olympics
Olympic freestyle skiers of Russia
Olympic bronze medalists for Russia
Olympic medalists in freestyle skiing
Medalists at the 2014 Winter Olympics
Sportspeople from Perm Krai